Temnostethus gracilis is a species of minute pirate bug in the family Anthocoridae. It is found in Europe and across the Palearctic to the Caucasus and Siberia (excluding China) and North America.

They are predatory on aphids, Psylloidea, Psocoptera and mites, but also on other small arthropods.

References

Further reading

External links

 

Hemiptera of Europe
Anthocoridae
Articles created by Qbugbot
Insects described in 1907
Taxa named by Géza Horváth